Dalian University of Technology Press or DUTP is a university press owned by Dalian University of Technology, in Dalian, Liaoning Province, China. It is the largest of the publishers in Dalian, including Dongbei University of Finance and Economics Press, Liaoning Normal University Press and Dalian Publishing Company.  It was established in 1985; its president is Dr. Jin Yingwei

Published books
Reflecting te vibrant IT Outsourcing business from Japan in the nearby Dalian Software Park and Dalian Hi-tech Zone, it publishes technical books and others, such as:
 Japanese Language by Koji Oikawa (2010)

See also
 Dalian University of Technology

References

External links 
 Official site (in Chinese)

Publishing companies of China
University presses of China
Dalian University of Technology
Chinese companies established in 1985
Publishing companies established in 1985
Companies based in Dalian